The Toa is a river located in the Guantánamo Province of Cuba, which flows across the country. This river is 131 kilometers long and has 72 tributaries. The Toa river is well known for its crystal clear waters.

Overview
It takes up about 70% of the Cuchillas del Toa Biosphere Reserve. The area around the river is home to many species of endemic flora and fauna, including at least 1000 species of flowers and 145 species of ferns. Species in danger of extinction, such as the tocororo (which is also the national bird of Cuba) and the hook-billed kite, are also among the fauna of this area.

See also
List of rivers of Cuba
Nipe-Sagua-Baracoa

References

Rivers of Cuba